Wagenknecht is a German surname, whre 'Wagen' means a 'horse-drawn vehicle', 'Knecht' a servant. Notable people with the surname include:

Addie Wagenknecht, American artist
Alfred Wagenknecht (1881–1956), German-American Communist
Detlef Wagenknecht (born 1959), German middle-distance runner
Edward Wagenknecht (1900–2004), American literary critic
Lukáš Wagenknecht (born 1978), Czech economist
Max Wagenknecht (1857–1922), German composer
Sahra Wagenknecht (born 1969), German politician (Left Party)

German-language surnames
Surnames of German origin
de:Wagenknecht